Gideon Robert University is a private university located  in Lusaka, Zambia.It was established in 2010.

References

External links 
 

Universities in Zambia
Lusaka
Educational institutions established in 2010
2010 establishments in Zambia